A Dialogue is a 1973 collaborative work featuring a multi-topic conversation between writers James Baldwin and Nikki Giovanni. The preface was written by Ida Lewis, the afterword by Orde M. Coombs. It was published by J. B. Lippincott & Co.

1973 non-fiction books
J. B. Lippincott & Co. books
Books by James Baldwin
African-American literature
Collaborative non-fiction books